The Viceroyalty of New Granada also called Viceroyalty of the New Kingdom of Granada  or Viceroyalty of Santafé was the name given on 27 May 1717, to the jurisdiction of the Spanish Empire in northern South America, corresponding to modern Colombia, Ecuador, Panama and Venezuela. Created in 1717 by King Felipe V, as part of a new territorial control policy, it was suspended in 1723 for financial problems and was restored in 1739 until the independence movement suspended it again in 1810. The territory corresponding to Panama was incorporated later in 1739, and the provinces of Venezuela were separated from the Viceroyalty and assigned to the Captaincy General of Venezuela in 1777. In addition to those core areas, the territory of the Viceroyalty of New Granada included Guyana, Trinidad and Tobago, southwestern Suriname, parts of northwestern Brazil, and northern Peru.

Colonial history 

Two centuries after the establishment of the New Kingdom of Granada in the 16th century, whose governor was dependent upon the Viceroy of Peru at Lima, and an audiencia at Santa Fé de Bogotá (today capital of the republic of Colombia), the slowness of communications between the two capitals led to the creation of an independent Viceroyalty of New Granada in 1717 (and its reestablishment in 1739 after a short interruption). Other provinces corresponding to modern Ecuador, the eastern and southern parts of today's Venezuela, and Panama came together in a political unit under the jurisdiction of Bogotá, confirming that city as one of the principal administrative centers of the Spanish possessions in the New World, along with Lima and Mexico City. Sporadic attempts at reform were directed at increasing efficiency and centralizing authority, but control from Spain was never very effective.

The rough and diverse geography of northern South America and the limited range of proper roads made travel and communications within the viceroyalty difficult. The establishment of an autonomous Captaincy General in Caracas in 1777 and the preservation of the older Audiencia of Quito, nominally subject to the Viceroy but for most purposes independent, was a response to the necessities of effectively governing the peripheral regions. Some analysts also consider that these measures reflected a degree of local traditions that eventually contributed to the differing political and national differences among these territories once they became independent in the nineteenth century and which the unifying efforts of Simón Bolívar could not overcome.

Guajira rebellion 

The Spanish had never subjugated the Wayuu. The two groups were in a more or less permanent state of war. There had been rebellions in 1701 (when they destroyed a Capuchin mission), 1727 (when more than 2,000 Wayuus attacked the Spanish), 1741, 1757, 1761 and 1768. In 1718, Governor Soto de Herrera called them "barbarians, horse thieves, worthy of death, without God, without law, and without a king." Of all the Indians in the territory of Colombia, the Wayuu were unique in having learned the use of firearms and horses.

In 1769 the Spanish took 22 Wayuus captive, in order to put them to work building the fortifications of Cartagena. The reaction of the Wayuus was unexpected. On 2 May 1769, at El Rincón, near Riohacha, they set their village afire, burning the church and two Spaniards who had taken refuge in it. They also captured the priest. The Spanish immediately dispatched an expedition from El Rincón to capture the Wayuus. At the head of this force was José Antonio de Sierra, a mestizo who had also headed the party that had taken the 22 Guajiro captives. The Guajiros recognized him and forced his party to take refuge in the house of the curate, which they then set afire. Sierra and eight of his men were killed.

This success was soon known in other Guajiro areas, and more men joined the revolt. According to Messía, at the peak, there were 20,000 Wayuus under arms. Many had firearms acquired from English and Dutch smugglers, sometimes even from the Spanish. This enabled the rebels to take nearly all the settlements of the region, which they burned. According to the authorities, more than 100 Spaniards were killed and many others were taken prisoner. Many cattle were also taken by the rebels. The Spaniards took refuge in Riohacha and sent urgent messages to Maracaibo, Valledupar, Santa Marta and Cartagena, the latter responding by sending 100 troops. The rebels themselves were not unified. Sierra's relatives among the Indians took up arms against the rebels to avenge his death. A battle between the two groups of Wayuus was fought at La Soledad. That and the arrival of the Spanish reinforcements caused the rebellion to fade away, but not before the Guajiro had regained much territory.

Comunero revolt

Separation of Venezuela

Independent history 
The retribution stoked renewed rebellion, which, combined with a weakened Spain, made possible a successful independence struggle led mainly by Simón Bolívar and Francisco de Paula Santander in neighboring Venezuela. Bolívar returned to New Granada only in 1819 after establishing himself as leader of the pro-independence forces in the Venezuelan llanos. From there Bolivar led an army over the Andes and captured New Granada after a quick campaign that ended at the Battle of Boyacá, on 7 August 1819, finally proclaimed independence in 1821. The pro-Spanish resistance was defeated in 1822 in the present territory of Colombia and in 1823 in Venezuela.

The territories of the viceroyalty gained full de facto independence from Spain between 1819 and 1822 after a series of military and political struggles, uniting in a republic now known as Gran Colombia.

With the dissolution of Gran Colombia, the states of Ecuador, Venezuela, and the Republic of New Granada were created. The Republic of New Granada, with its capital at Bogotá, lasted from 1831 to 1856. The name "Colombia" reappeared in the "United States of Colombia"; the new name for the country having been introduced by a liberal government after a civil war. The use of the term "New Granada" survived in conservative circles, such as among ecclesiastics.

Demographics 
New Granada was estimated to have 4,345,000 inhabitants in 1819.

Main cities 
By population
1 – Santa Fe de Bogotá
2 – Caracas
3 – Cartagena de Indias
4 – Quito
5 – Panama
6 – Cuenca
7 – Popayán
8 – Tunja
9 – Santa Marta
10 – Guayaquil

See also 
 History of the Americas
 History of Colombia
 History of Ecuador
 History of Venezuela
 List of Viceroys of New Granada
 Spanish Empire
 Criollo people

Notes

Bibliography 
Fisher, John R., Allan J. Keuthe and Anthony McFarlane, eds. Reform and Insurrection in Bourbon New Granada and Peru. Baton Rouge, Louisiana State University Press, 1990. 
Kuethe, Alan J. Military Reform and Society in New Granada, 1773-1808. Gainesville, University Presses of Florida, 1978. 
McFarlane, Anthony. Colombia Before Independence: Economy, Society, and Politics under Bourbon Rule. Cambridge, Cambridge University Press, 1993. 
Phelan, John Leddy. The People and the King: The Comunero Revolution in Colombia, 1781. Madison, University of Wisconsin Press, 1978. 
Torres, James. "Bullion and Monetary Flows in the Northern Andes: New Evidence and Insights". Revista Tiempo y Economia 6(1), 13–46,

External links 

 
New Granada
Former Spanish colonies
Spanish colonization of the Americas
 02
Colonial Panama
Colonial Venezuela
Colonial Brazil
Colonial Peru
Former colonies in South America
Former countries in Central America
History of Central America
History of South America
History of Colombia
History of Costa Rica
History of Ecuador
History of Guyana
History of Nicaragua
History of Panama
Spanish period of Trinidad and Tobago
History of Venezuela
Former countries in North America
Former countries in South America
18th century in Central America
19th century in Central America
18th century in South America
19th century in South America
18th century in Colombia
19th century in Colombia
New Granada, Viceroyalty of
New Granada, Viceroyalty of
Spain–Venezuela relations
Titles of nobility in the Americas
1717 establishments in the Viceroyalty of New Granada
1717 establishments in South America
1822 disestablishments in South America
Spanish-speaking countries and territories